Rajendra Chandrika (born 8 August 1989) is a West Indian first-class cricketer. In May 2015 he was named in the 14-man Test squad to face Australia. He made his Test debut in the second Test of the series on 11 June at Sabina Park, Kingston.

References

External links
 

1989 births
Living people
Guyanese cricketers
West Indies Test cricketers
Guyana cricketers
People from Demerara-Mahaica
Indo-Guyanese people